Rides a Dread Legion is a fantasy novel by American writer  Raymond E. Feist. It is the first book in  The Demonwar Saga and was published in 2009. It is followed by At the Gates of Darkness.

Background
Rides a Dread Legion was first published in Australia and the United Kingdom at the beginning of March 2009. It was released in the United States at the end of March and in New Zealand in September 2009. It has also been translated into Dutch, Hungarian and Czech.

Synopsis
Ten years after the cataclysmic events of Wrath of a Mad God, Midkemia now faces a new danger thought buried in myth and antiquity.

A lost race of elves, the taredhel or 'people of the stars', have found a way across the universe to reach Midkemia. On their current home world, these elves are hard pressed by a ravaging demon horde, and what was once a huge empire has been reduced to a handful of survivors. The cornerstone of taredhel lore is the tale of their lost origins in the world they call simply 'Home', a place lost in the mists of time. Now they are convinced that Midkemia is that place, and they are coming to reclaim it. Ruthless and arrogant, the taredhel intend to let nothing stand in their way; but before long, Pug and the Conclave realise that it's not necessarily the elves, but the demon horde pursuing them where the true danger lies. And hanging over Pug always is the prophecy that he will be doomed to watch everyone he loves die before him.

Reception
The Independent Weekly stated that "despite the driving force of the book being a basic survival engine, there is enough brio to allow the reader to be entertained."

References

2009 American novels
2009 fantasy novels
HarperCollins books
Novels by Raymond E. Feist